Barrack Street is a street in Hobart, Tasmania. The Hobart Town military barracks were once located on this street.

See also

References

Streets in Hobart